Milton Keynes & District Reform Synagogue, also known as Beit Echud, is a Reform Jewish community on Hainault Avenue in Milton Keynes, Buckinghamshire, England. Its current synagogue building was opened in 2002. 

The community was founded in 1978 and is affiliated to the Movement for Reform Judaism. It publishes a members' newsletter, Listen.

See also
 List of Jewish communities in the United Kingdom
 List of former synagogues in the United Kingdom
 Movement for Reform Judaism

References

External links 
 

Buildings and structures in Milton Keynes
Reform synagogues in the United Kingdom